Lobulicium is a fungal genus in the family Atheliaceae. The genus is monotypic, containing the single species Lobulicium occultum, found in Europe. The fungus produces small, crust-like (resupinate) fruit bodies on decayed wood. Its spores are thin-walled, and have seven lobes.

References

External links

Atheliales
Monotypic Basidiomycota genera